Klepon (pronounced Klē-pon), or kelepon, is a snack of sweet rice cake balls filled with molten palm sugar and coated in grated coconut. Of Javanese origin, the green-coloured glutinous rice balls are one of the popular traditional kue in Indonesian cuisine.

Ingredients and cooking method
Klepon is a boiled rice cake stuffed with liquid palm sugar (gula jawa/merah/melaka) and coated in flaked coconut. The dough is made from glutinous rice flour, sometimes mixed with tapioca, and a paste made from the leaves of the pandan or dracaena plants (daun suji) — whose leaves are used widely in Southeast Asian cooking – giving the dough its green colour.

The small pieces of palm sugar are initially solid when inserted into the glutinous rice dough and rolled into balls. The balls are subsequently boiled, which melts the palm sugar and creates a sweet liquid inside the balls' cores. Skill is involved in ensuring that the liquid does not leak out of the final product. The balls are finally rolled in shredded coconut, adhering to the sticky surface of the glutinous rice dough.

Klepon are ideally left to cool for some time before consumption to prevent burning from the hot liquid palm sugar. They are traditionally served in banana leaves, usually in sets of four or ten balls; plastic packaging is also used in recent times.

Names

Klepon is the Javanese name for this sweet glutinous rice balls, which literally means "animal's ovary". In other parts of Indonesia, such as in Sulawesi, Sumatra and in neighbouring Malaysia, it is mainly known as onde-onde since many non-Javanese often confuse it with another kind of jajan, "onde-onde" (Chinese jian dui). In some regions, it is also known by the name 'buah melaka' (gooseberry fruit). In Java however, onde-onde refers to the Chinese jian dui, a rice cake ball coated with sesame seeds and filled with sweet green bean paste. Although popular in Indonesia and neighboring areas, klepon is originated in Java. This can be proven by its etymology, history, and how this food is spread outside the region. 

The dish is also called as klepon in the Netherlands, due to its colonial ties with Java. In the 1950s, klepon was introduced by Indo immigrants to the Netherlands and is readily available in toko shops, Dutch or Chinese Indonesian restaurants and supermarkets throughout the country.

In Java, klepon, along with getuk and cenil, are often eaten as morning or afternoon snacks. They are categorised as jajan pasar (market snack) in traditional markets and villages and kue basah (moist kue) in urban areas due to Chinese influence in the naming.

Variants and similar dish

Traditional klepon or onde onde is quite homogeneous in Indonesia, Malaysia and Singapore. Nevertheless, new recipes has been developed: some modern variants replacing the rice flour with yam or sweet potato (Indonesian: ubi) dough, or replacing the liquid palm sugar filling with chocolate, or replacing the grated coconut with grated cheddar cheese. Colourful klepon also has been created using potato-based dough and food colouring to make them more appealing for children.

Klepon is quite similar to Kue putu, with the difference in its shape, texture and the flour being used — klepon uses glutinous rice flour, while kue putu uses common rice flour, klepon has somewhat a chewy sticky texture similar to mochi, while kue putu has soft yet crumbly texture akin to common cake. Klepon shape is balls, while kue putu is tubular using hollow bamboo tube as mould.

Recently there is a modern fusion that combine the baking technique of cupcake with onde-onde ingredients.

In India, these snacks resembles a klepon, known as paan ladoo, but with different ingredients.

See also 

 List of Indonesian cuisine
 Javanese cuisine
 List of stuffed dishes

References 

Vegetarian dishes of Indonesia
Malaysian snack foods
Foods containing coconut
Kue
Stuffed dishes